Richard Beard House is a historic home located near Hillsboro, Pocahontas County, West Virginia. It was built about 1890, and is a two-story Queen Anne style frame dwelling. The house has a side facing T-plan. The front facade features a one-story front porch running one half the width of the house and a three-sided, hip roof bay.  Also on the property is a spring house dated to about 1890.

It was listed on the National Register of Historic Places in 2002.

References

Houses on the National Register of Historic Places in West Virginia
Queen Anne architecture in West Virginia
Houses completed in 1890
Houses in Pocahontas County, West Virginia
National Register of Historic Places in Pocahontas County, West Virginia